Jozsef Koves (born 1938), is a Hungarian writer, currently living in Hungary.

Main Works

The Griffin-Licence (original title: A griff-licenc) (satire, 1984)
The Shared Dog (novel, 1982)
Longlegged, Allfat, Chucklehead (play, 2000)
Golden Book of Jewish Humor (compilation, 2003)
Marionette Short Story (short-story, 1984)
If I Remember Well to One of My Lives (novel, 2000)

Editorial Works

Half a Hundred Sentences for My Mother (2004)
Half a Hundred Sentences about Love 2000
25 Years of the General Education 1973
Book of Bosom-Friends 1997

Publications

The Conditions are better in the Book Stores Though - Life and Literature, 4. vol, 48th Year

Business

Owner of K.U.K. Publishing, Budapest

Quotes

"Now I would have to sign here... But my name... Unfortunately, I cannot remember it most of the time."

See also
 Alfred Soultan
 István Fekete

Sources

http://www.szinhaz.hu/karpatok/csiki/e_nyakiglab.html
http://www.kisalfold.hu/cikk.php?id=&cid=75549
http://apro.origo.hu/showAdvert,39074,165,2077.html
https://web.archive.org/web/20070930132757/http://www.oszk.hu/gyt/2000_191/elemi/454261.html
http://www.intermedia.c3.hu/dogandbeer/irodalom.htm
http://www.es.hu/pd/display.asp?channel=AGORA0404&article=2004-0126-0940-21VNGA
http://www.jgytf.u-szeged.hu/tanszek/magyar/bi/bibib.htm
http://www.tujvmkvk.hu:4505/ALEPH/SESSION-8256/direct-doc/TIV01-0089223-999-SYSNO
http://www.kulturinfo.hu/moreinfo.gcw?prgid=20031

Hungarian writers
1938 births
Living people